Dannonchapel is a ruined farm in Cornwall, England. It is about two miles southwest of Delabole. Dannonchapel was a farm in Domesday Book (1086) occupied by one villein and 4 serfs, and held by Blohin from Robert, Count of Mortain. Its value was reduced to 15 shillings (in the reign of King Edward it was 25 shillings i.e. £1-25).

See also

 List of farms in Cornwall

References

Houses in Cornwall
Farms in Cornwall
Manors in Cornwall